Ibrahim Jamal Abdelfattah (Arabic:إبراهيم جمال عبد الفتاح) (born 16 August 1988) is a Qatari born-Egyptian footballer. He currently plays as a midfielder for Al-Shahania on loan from Qatar.

Career
Ibrahim Jamal started his career at Qatar SC. On 30 September 2017, Ibrahim Jamal made his professional debut for Qatar SC against Al Kharaitiyat in the Pro League. He landed with Qatar SC from the Qatar Stars League to the Qatari Second Division in 2015-16 season. And ended up with Qatar SC from the Qatari Second Division to the Qatar Stars League in the 2016-17 season.

References

External links

Qatari footballers
Qatari people of Egyptian descent
Naturalised citizens of Qatar
Qatar SC players
Muaither SC players
Al-Shahania SC players
Qatar Stars League players
Qatari Second Division players
Association football midfielders
Place of birth missing (living people)
Living people
1988 births